Dubautia is a genus of flowering plant in the family Asteraceae. The genus was named after Joseph Eugène DuBaut (1796-1832), an officer in the French Navy who participated in Freycinet's expedition.

The entire genus is endemic to Hawaii. It contains more species than the other two genera in the silversword alliance, including cushion plants, shrubs, trees, and lianas.

Species
Accepted species and subspecies 
{|
|- valign=top
|
 Dubautia arborea (A.Gray) D.D.Keck – tree dubautia
 Dubautia caliginis (C.N.Forbes) ined.
 Dubautia ciliolata (DC.) D.D.Keck
 Dubautia degeneri (Sherff) ined.	
 Dubautia demissifolia (Sherff) D.D.Keck	
 Dubautia grayana (Hillebr.) ined.	
 Dubautia gymnoxiphium (A.Gray) ined.
 Dubautia herbstobatae G.D.Carr
 Dubautia hobdyi (H.St.John) ined.
 Dubautia imbricata H.St.John & G.D.Carr
 Dubautia imbricata subsp. acronaea G.D.Carr
 Dubautia imbricata subsp. imbricata
 Dubautia kai (C.N.Forbes) ined.
 Dubautia kalalauensis B.G.Baldwin & G.D.Carr
 Dubautia kauensis (Rock & M.Neal) ined.
 Dubautia kenwoodii G.D.Carr
 Dubautia knudsenii Hillebr.
 Dubautia laevigata A.Gray
 Dubautia latifolia (A.Gray) D.D.Keck
 Dubautia laxa Hook. & Arn.
 Dubautia linearis (Gaudich.) D.D.Keck
 Dubautia linearis subsp. hillebrandii (H.Mann) G.D.Carr
 Dubautia linearis subsp. linearis Dubautia menziesii (A.Gray) D.D.Keck
|
 Dubautia microcephala Skottsberg – small-head dubautia
 Dubautia montana (H.Mann) D.D.Keck
 Dubautia paleata A.Gray
 Dubautia paludosa (H.St.John) ined.
 Dubautia pauciflorula H.St. John & G.D.Carr
 Dubautia plantaginea Gaudich.Dubautia plantaginea subsp. humilis G.D.CarrDubautia plantaginea subsp. magnifolia (Sherff) G.D.CarrDubautia plantaginea subsp. plantaginea Dubautia platyphylla (A.Gray) D.D.Keck
 Dubautia raillardioides Hillebr.
 Dubautia reticulata (Sherff) D.D.Keck – net-veined dubautia
 Dubautia sandwicensis (DC.) ined.
 Dubautia scabra (DC.) D.D.Keck
 Dubautia sherffiana Fosberg
 Dubautia syndetica G.D.Carr & D.H.Lorence
 Dubautia thyrsiflora (Sherff) D.D.Keck	
 Dubautia virescens (Hillebr.) ined.
 Dubautia waialealae Rock
 Dubautia waianapanapaensis G.D.Carr
|}

References

External links
 
 
 Hawaiian Native Plant Genera - Dubautia
 Dubautia spp.
 Dubautia'' (page 469 and plate 197) In: Voyage de l'Uranie, Botanique At: Biodiversity Heritage Library

 
Asteraceae genera
Endemic flora of Hawaii
Taxonomy articles created by Polbot